Berthold Friedrich Wilhelm Ernst August Heinrich Karl Prinz und Markgraf von Baden, Herzog von Zähringen (24 February 1906 – 27 October 1963), styled Margrave of Baden, was the head of the House of Baden, which had reigned over the Grand Duchy of Baden until 1918, from 1929 until his death. He was invalided out of the Nazi Party's Wehrmacht in 1940 after being injured in France.

Marriage and children
The only son and younger child of Prince Maximilian, Margrave of Baden and Princess Marie Louise of Hanover and Cumberland, Berthold married his second cousin Princess Theodora of Greece and Denmark, daughter of Prince Andrew of Greece and Denmark and Princess Alice of Battenberg, on 17 August 1931 in Baden-Baden. Via his marriage, he was the brother-in-law of Prince Philip of Greece and Denmark, later Philip, Duke of Edinburgh from November 1947. His bride was also his second cousin, through Christian IX of Denmark.

The couple had the following children:
 Princess Margarita Alice Thyra Viktoria Marie Louise Scholastica (Salem, 14 July 1932 – London, 15 January 2013), married, civilly, in Salem on 5 June 1957 and religiously on 6 June 1957 Prince Tomislav of Yugoslavia, and had issue; divorced in 1981.
 Prince Max Andreas Friedrich Gustav Ernst August Bernhard (3 July 1933 – 29 December 2022), married civilly on 23 September 1966 at Salem and religiously on 30 September 1966 at Persenbeug Castle, Austria, Archduchess Valerie of Austria, and has four children.
 Prince Ludwig Wilhelm Georg Ernst Christoph (b. Karlsruhe, 16 March 1937), married civilly in Salem on 21 September 1967 and religiously in Wald, Lower Austria, on 21 October 1967 Princess Anna Maria (Marianne) Henrietta Eleonora Gobertina of Auersperg-Breunner (b. Zseliz, Hungary, today Želiezovce, Slovakia, 15 December 1943), and has three children:
 Princess Sophie Thyra Josephine Georgine Henriette (b. Heidelberg, 8 July 1975), unmarried and without issue
 Prince Berthold Ernst-August Emich Rainer (b. Heidelberg, 8 October 1976), married civ. in 2020 and rel. on 28 August 2021 Nina Schröder and had a daughter: 
 Princess Hilda of Baden (born February 2021)
 Princess Aglaë Margarete Tatiana Mary (b. Heidelberg, 3 March 1981), married in 2019 Wolf von Trotha (b. 28 August 1974)

Death
Berthold died on 27 October 1963, aged 57, in Spaichingen. He was in a car driving with his son when he suddenly died from an acute health issue, probably a heart attack. He was succeeded as titular margrave and head of house by his son Max.

Ancestry

Notes

References

Bibliography
 
 

1906 births
1963 deaths
Nobility from Karlsruhe
House of Zähringen
German princes
German military personnel of World War II